Kamenets is a rural locality (a village) in Golovinskoye Rural Settlement, Sudogodsky District, Vladimir Oblast, Russia. The population was 46 as of 2010.

Geography 
Kamenets is located 32 km west of Sudogda (the district's administrative centre) by road. Golovino is the nearest rural locality.

References 

Rural localities in Sudogodsky District